The Russian Federation joined the World Bank after the collapse of the Soviet Union, which led to the formation of a new state and economy as a constitutional republic. The federation joined the World Bank on June 16, 1992. Since then, Russian projects funded by the World Bank have ranged from public administration and law to energy development and fishing. On March 2, 2022, the World Bank halted all programs in Russia as well as Belarus due to their war on Ukraine.

Contributions and needs 
According to the World Bank, Russia experienced a period of strong economic growth during the 2000s. By 2012, growth has slowed along with the pace of reform. Russia must address key constraints to productivity growth, such as the remaining weaknesses in the investment climate, the lack of sufficient competition, barriers to infrastructure connectivity, companies' relatively-low innovation capacity and the mismatch between available skills and those demanded by the labor market. Improving the health of the population and the access to and quality by the labor market. Improving public health and access to quality education are also essential. Strengthening governance at all levels and ensuring fiscal and environmental sustainability must underlie these efforts. Progress is critical for Russia to return to sustainable growth and expansion of shared prosperity across the country. The World Bank outlined three requirements for Russian sustainability: governance, maintaining fiscal sustainability and better management of environmental and natural resources.

In a report published in 2016, the level of poverty would soon reach 2007 levels as the Russian economy continued to contract and purchasing power was eroded by inflation. The number of poor people in Russia was expected to rise to over 20 million (out of a population of just over 140 million), and the government would have difficulty combating rising poverty due to the collapse of global oil prices. The price of oil had fallen to under $40 per barrel, almost one-third of its 2014 price. According to the World Bank, serious structural reform (which it has long said are needed to ensure sustainable economic growth) were not likely before the 2018 presidential election.

In 2011, Russia committed as much as $150 million to the World Bank. In March 2012, Russia established the Eurasian Center for Food Security (ECFS). Hosted by Moscow State University, the center offers education programs and policy and technical recommendations for improved agricultural performance, sustainable rural development and natural-resources management. According to their website, the ECFS has a vision of Food security through sustainable management of natural resources and market regulation. Its mission statement aims to "encourage and coordinate collective action to strengthening food security in Eurasia through research and development".

Since 2018 the chief of the Russian mission to the World Bank is Roman Marshavin.

Active projects in Russia 
On June 13, 2017, there were nine active projects in Russia and 10 more related to a new pipeline. The projects involved public administration, law and justice, agriculture, fishing and forestry, and energy and mining.

On March 2, 2022 the World Bank Group has stopped all its programs in Russia and Belarus with immediate effect following "the Russian invasion of Ukraine and hostilities against the people of Ukraine". This means at present there are no active World Bank projects in Russia.

References 

10. http://www.worldbank.org/en/country/russia [further more direct references]

11. http://www.worldbank.org/

12. http://projects.worldbank.org/search?lang=en&searchTerm=&countrycode_exact=RU

World Bank Group relations